Amylibacter kogurei is a Gram-negative bacterium from the genus of Amylibacter.

References

Rhodobacteraceae
Bacteria described in 2018